The story of the postage stamps and postal history of Yugoslavia officially begins with the formation of the Kingdom of Serbs, Croats and Slovenes on 1 December 1918.

Formation 

Prior to the formation of the Kingdom, each of the constituent territories had their own postal systems and history. Bosnia and Herzegovina and Croatia-Slavonia actually issued stamps for the new regime in November, before it was formally created. In the former case the Austrian-issued pictorial stamps of 1910 were overprinted, some in Latin characters reading "DRZAVA S.H.S. / 1918 1918 / Bosna j Hercegovina" and others in their Cyrillic equivalent. In Croatia-Slavonia, stamps of Hungary overprinted with "HRVATSKA / SHS" went on sale 18 November. In Slovenia, design work began at this time, with the first stamps of the Verigar issue going on sale 3 January 1919.

Croatia-Slavonia issued their own designs of stamps in 1919 as well, using various allegorical designs. Slovenia issued additional allegorical designs in 1919, along with high values depicting King Peter I.

First stamps 
The first stamps intended for use throughout the kingdom were issued 16 January 1921. The lower values depicted Crown Prince Alexander, and the higher values (1 dinar and up), King Peter. In January 1923, the higher values were replaced by the image of now-King Alexander. Variations on the design appeared in issues of 1924 (different portrait) and 1926 (facing right instead of left, typographed instead of engraved).

Yugoslavia 

The name of the state was changed to "Kingdom of Yugoslavia" on 3 October 1929. In 1931, a new series was the first to be inscribed "JUGOSLAVIA". The old series of 1926 was also overprinted with the new name, in 1933. Just a week after Alexander's assassination in 1934, the 1931 issues were re-issued with black borders, and in 1935, the first anniversary of his death was marked by an issue of five stamps. In the meantime, new definitives depicted the young King Peter II.

In 1936, Serbian-American inventor Nikola Tesla, honored on his 80th birthday, became the first non-royal on a Yugoslavian stamp.

A new definitive series of 1939 showed an older Peter II; it would be the last series issued by the kingdom.

World War II 
During the occupations of World War II, a variety of issues were in use. Slovenia was under Italian and then German occupation; the Italians overprinted Yugoslavian stamps, while the Germans overprinted Italian stamps and then in 1945 issued a series of 16 stamps depicting local scenery and inscribed "PROVINZ LAIBACH" and "LJUBLJANSKA POKRAJINA". Serbia was under German occupation, which overprinted Yugoslav stamps with "SERBIEN", and later its own stamps. Croatia became a puppet state issuing its own stamps.

Federal Yugoslavia 

Yugoslavia resumed its stamp issues in December 1944 with overprints of German occupation stamps of Serbia, followed in early 1945 by a series depicting Josip Broz Tito. In October, stamps with a different depiction of Tito were joined with view of partisans and the city of Jajce in a definitive series that would continue in use for the rest of the 1940s.

The republic began frequent issues of pictorial and propaganda stamps from 1947 on. The definitive series of 1950 featured workers in a variety of industries, and was followed by additional stamps in different denominations and colors as late as 1955. Beginning in 1958, the definitives depicted industrial progress in various forms, with several re-issues, the last in 1966. In 1967, the 75th birthday of Tito was marked with a series of his profile, and new stamps of this design appeared until 1972.

Breakup of Yugoslavia 
In the aftermath of the Yugoslav Wars, two of the Yugoslav republics, Serbia and Montenegro, reconstituted as the "Federal Republic of Yugoslavia" in 1992. The breakup of Yugoslavia had little effect on its stamp issues, although most were sold only to collectors; the Scott catalog stops pricing used stamps dating from 1992 and later, a practice indicating lack of evidence for postal usage.

Serbia and Montenegro 

On 4 February 2003, a loose state union or confederacy, the State Union of Serbia and Montenegro, was created. On 3 April 2003, two stamps were issued with the new name of the state “Srbija i Crna Gora”. Since Montenegro had adopted the euro in 2002, stamps of the confederation were denominated in both the Serbian dinar and the euro.

Following Montenegro's declaration of independence, the confederation was dissolved in June 2006.

Istria issues 
After the war, from 1945 to 1947, the former Italian-held Venezia Giulia was occupied by Allied Anglo-American troops (Zone “A” - the territory with the city of Trieste) and troops of the Yugoslav People's Army (Zone “B” - Istria and the Slovene Littoral). The zones of occupation were demarcated along the so-called Morgan Line. In Zone B, stamps inscribed "Istra Slovensko Primorje/Istria Littorale Sloveno" were issued in August 1945. Italy ceded most of those lands under Yugoslav administration to Yugoslavia following the Paris Peace Treaty in 1947.

Free Territory of Trieste 

The 1947 Peace Treaty established Trieste and the surrounding area as the Free Territory of Trieste, also divided into zones A and B, under Allied military administration and Yugoslav military administration, respectively. In Zone B, stamps inscribed "STT VUJA" ("Free territory of Trieste, Military Administration of the Yugoslav Army") were issued. The Free Territory was divided between Italy and Yugoslavia in 1954, with Zone B joining Yugoslavia.

See also 
Postage stamps and postal history of Bosnia and Herzegovina
Postage stamps and postal history of Croatia
Postage stamps and postal history of Macedonia
Postage stamps and postal history of Montenegro
Postage stamps and postal history of Serbia
Postage stamps and postal history of Slovenia

References and sources
References

Sources
 Scott catalogue
Rossiter, Stuart & John Flower. The Stamp Atlas. London: Macdonald, 1986, pp. 117-119.

Further reading
 Fleck, Vladimir. Die Briefmarken von Jugoslawien. Frankfurt am Main: [Arbeitsgemeinschaft Neues Handbuch der Briefmarkenkunde], 1964 126p.
 Fleck, Vladimir. Priručnik maraka jugoslavenskih zemalja = Manuel de timbres-poste des pays yougoslaves. Zagreb: Hrvatski filatelistički savez, 1947-1954

External links 
 Stamp Domain collection of links to Yugoslavian philately pages
 Yugoslavia Stamps on Banatul.com

Philately of Croatia
Philately of Yugoslavia